William Charles Wilde (24 September 1904 – 18 June 1976), known as Jimmy Wilde, was an English professional footballer who played in the Football League, for Crystal Palace, as a defender.

Early life
Wilde was born on 24 September 1904 in Lyndhurst, Hampshire and signed for Crystal Palace on 17 November 1928, after leaving the Army.

Career
Wilde made his debut on 24 November 1928 in a home FA Cup tie 2–0 win against Kettering Town and his performance against Peter Simpson (later a Palace colleague), went a long way to ensuring his first team place in the future. Wilde remained at Palace for ten years and was a first team regular for eight seasons, six of them as captain, after which he continued to play regularly for the reserves, helping with the development of younger players, in particular Arthur Hudgell. Wilde made a total of 293 appearances for Crystal Palace.  this was still within the 20 highest player appearances for the club. He retired from playing in 1938, having made only three first team appearances over the previous two seasons.

Personal life
Jimmy Wilde died on 18 June 1976, aged 71.

References

External links
Jimmy Wilde at holmesdale.net

1904 births
1976 deaths
People from Lyndhurst, Hampshire
English footballers
Association football defenders
Crystal Palace F.C. players
English Football League players
20th-century British Army personnel